was the 4th daimyō of Mutsuura Domain in southern Musashi Province, Honshū, Japan (modern-day Kanazawa-ku, Yokohama, Kanagawa prefecture) and 7th head of the Yonekura clan. His courtesy title was Nagato-no-kami.

Biography
Yonekura Masakata was born as the 2nd son of Yonekura Masaharu, the 3rd daimyō of Mutsuura Domain. He was appointed heir in 1777 and succeeded his father in December 1785. As daimyō, he was assigned to several ceremonial postings as guard of various gates to Edo Castle. However, in 1793 he resigned from his posts due to illness, but retained the position of daimyō. He died on August 5, 1798 at the age of 40.

His grave is at the temple of Hase-dera in Shibuya, Tokyo.

Masakata was married to the daughter of Yanagisawa Nobutoki, daimyō of Koriyama Domain, by whom he had two daughters.

References 
 "Mutsuura-han" on Edo 300 HTML
 The content of much of this article was derived from that of the corresponding article on Japanese Wikipedia.

Fudai daimyo
1759 births
Masakata
1798 deaths
People from Yokohama